Old Greenwich is an affluent coastal village in Fairfield County, Connecticut,  United States.  As of the 2010 census it had a population of 6,611. 

The town of Greenwich is one political and taxing body, but consists of several distinct sections or neighborhoods, such as Byram, Cos Cob, Glenville, Mianus, Old Greenwich, Riverside and Greenwich (sometimes referred to as central, or downtown, Greenwich). Of these neighborhoods, three (Cos Cob, Old Greenwich, and Riverside) have separate postal names and ZIP codes.

History 

One of the founding settlers of Old Greenwich was Elizabeth Fones, niece and daughter-in-law of John Winthrop, founder and Governor of the Massachusetts Bay Colony. What is now called Greenwich Point was known for much of its early history as "Elizabeth Neck" in recognition of Elizabeth (Fones) Feake Hallet and her 1640 purchase of the Point and much of the area now known as Old Greenwich.

The Old Greenwich Railroad Station, originally called the "Sound Beach Railroad Station", built in 1894 and added to the National Register of Historic Places in 1989, serves commuters in the neighborhood. The town's largest beach is on a long, thin peninsula at the southwest end of the neighborhood. The town's local beach is called Tod's Point after a former resident. The beach is now public property, which belongs to the town of Greenwich. Residents can purchase a seasonal beach pass.  Non-residents can purchase a one-day pass for $7 per person and $35 per vehicle.  During "off season", Innis Arden, a local golf club, is a popular sledding destination for kids in Old Greenwich and neighboring Stamford.

Old Greenwich was known as "Sound Beach" in the 19th century for its proximity to Long Island Sound, and the main road through the small downtown business section is Sound Beach Avenue.

Old Greenwich had an industrial presence in the 1950s and 1960s when Electrolux had a vacuum manufacturing facility on Forest Avenue, opposite "ECCman Center" (now Greenwich Civic Center). Condé Nast operated a printing facility in Old Greenwich from 1924 to 1964 which published many different magazines, including Vogue, Vanity Fair and House & Garden.

The town of Greenwich has one political body (RTM – Representative Town Meeting).  It has several distinct sections each with its own mailing address and ZIP code, such as Byram, Cos Cob, Glenville, Mianus, and Riverside and Greenwich proper (downtown Greenwich).  The original "well to do" population lived mainly in "The Back Country" (north of the Merritt Parkway) or in the exclusive Belle Haven area on the waterfront. The town was founded there in 1641.

Geography 
According to the U.S. Census Bureau, Old Greenwich has a total area of 3.48 mi2 (9.01 km2), of which 2.00 mi2 (5.17 km2) is land and 1.48 mi2 (3.84 km2), or 42.5%, is water.

Notable people

Edwin Binney
Ruth Madoff, wife of Bernie Madoff
Tim Mazzetti
Mike Sandlock
Jack Trout
Edward Vick
Constance Walton
 Victor Borge

Gallery

See also
List of highest-income urban neighborhoods in the United States

References 

Neighborhoods in Connecticut
Greenwich, Connecticut
Census-designated places in Fairfield County, Connecticut
Census-designated places in Connecticut
Populated coastal places in Connecticut